Hirschenstein is the name of the following geographical objects:

Places
 Hirschenstein (Bad Großpertholz), village in the municipality of Bad Großpertholz, district of Gmünd, Lower Austria
 Hirschenstein, the old name for Jelenov, village in the borough of Rejštejn, Okres Klatovy, Pilsen Region, Czech Republic

Mountains:
 Hirschenstein (Bavarian Forest) (1,092 m), in the Bavarian Forest near Lindenau (Achslach),  Regen, Bavaria, Germany
 Hirschenstein (Bohemian Forest) (1,026 m), in the Mühlviertel near Vorderweißenstein, district of Urfahr-Umgebung, Upper Austria
 Großer Hirschenstein (862 m), and Kleiner Hirschenstein (836 m), in the Güns Mountains, near Markt Neuhodis, Oberwart, Burgenland, Austria
 Hirschenstein (Aist-Naarn Kuppenland) (c. 800 m), in the Mühlviertel near St. Leonhard bei Freistadt, Freistadt, Upper Austria
 Hirschenstein (Vienna Woods) (735 m), near St. Corona am Schöpfl, Baden District, Lower Austria
 Hirschenstein, old name for the Losín (726 m), near Jindřichov u Šumperka, Okres Šumperk, Olmütz Region, Czech Republic
 Hirschenstein (Saxony) (610 m), in the Ore Mountains, near Hartmannsdorf bei Kirchberg, Saxony, Germany

See also
 Hirschstein
 Hirschenkogel
 Hirschensteiner Berg